Santa Cruz is a village on São Tomé Island in the nation of São Tomé and Príncipe. Its population is 191 (2012 census). It lies 1 km north of Santa Margarida and 1 km west of Madalena.

References

Populated places in Mé-Zóchi District